The four-toed amapasaurus (Amapasaurus tetradactylus) is a lizard that was discovered in 1970 by Osvaldo Rodrigues da Cunha. It is the only species in the genus Amapasaurus.

Geographic range
This species is found in Brazil and Guyana.

Description
It has small atrophied legs. It is very similar to the genus Leposoma, except for the number of fingers. Amapasaurus tetradactylus has four digits, and the lizards of the genus Leposoma have five.

Habitat and behavior
It lives on the forest floor and is diurnal.

Reproduction
Amapasaurus tetradactylus is oviparous.

References

External links
Factsheet from the European Molecular Biology Laboratory in Heidelberg, Germany.
List of publishings, mentioning Cunha's article
Journal Article: Cunha, Osvaldo Rodrigues da. 1970. Lacertilios da Amazonia IV - Um nôvo gênero e espécie de lagarto do território federal do Amapá (Lacertilia-Teiidae) Boletim do Museu Paraense Emilio Goeldi 74:1-8 

Reptiles of Brazil
Reptiles of Guyana
Gymnophthalmidae
Reptiles described in 1970
Taxa named by Osvaldo Rodrigues da Cunha